The Georgia Wing of Civil Air Patrol (CAP) is the highest echelon of CAP in the State of Georgia. Georgia Wing headquarters are located at Dobbins Air Reserve Base in Marietta, Georgia.
Georgia Wing is abbreviated as "GAWG", and is often referred to by its members as "GA-Wing".

Mission

CAP has three primary missions: providing emergency services; offering cadet programs for youth; and providing aerospace education for CAP members and the general public.

Emergency services 
CAP provides emergency services including search and rescue, disaster relief support and assistance in humanitarian aid missions. The CAP provides Air Force support through conducting light transport, communications support, and low-altitude route surveys. CAP may also assist in counter-drug missions, if required.

Cadet programs 
CAP offers a cadet program for youth ages12 to 21. The program is organized as a sixteen-step training program which offers aerospace education, leadership training, physical fitness, and moral leadership.

Aerospace education 
CAP provides aerospace education for both CAP members and the general public. It includes providing training to the members of the CAP, and offering workshops for youth across the nation via schools and public aviation events, primarily.

Structure

Georgia Wing is the highest echelon of Civil Air Patrol in Georgia. GA Wing reports to Southeast Region CAP, who reports to CAP National Headquarters.

Below the Wing level, Georgia is divided into Groups. Each Group conducts its own training and programs, as well as participates in larger-scale training and events with the rest of Georgia Wing, Southeast Region, and National CAP organizations (e.g. professional development classes, emergency services training classes and exercises, cadet flight orientation events, and cadet and senior aerospace and leadership training events). 

Underneath each Group are numerous squadrons. Squadrons are the local level of organization, and squadrons typically meet weekly to conduct training. There are three types of Civil Air Patrol squadrons. A cadet squadron focuses primarily on providing training and education (leadership, character development, aerospace education, and emergency services training) for cadets. A senior squadron is a unit dedicated to allowing senior members to focus on CAP's missions. Composite squadrons have both cadets and senior members working together.

Groups and Squadrons

Group 1
Group I is responsible for operations in and around Northwest Metro Atlanta.

Group 2
Group 2 operates around Northeastern Metro Atlanta.

Group 3
Group 3 operates in the Central Georgia area.

Group 4
Group 4 conducts operations in the East Georgia area.

Group 5
Group 5 conducts operations in the Northern Georgia area.

Group 6
Group 6 conducts operations in the Western Georgia area.

Schools

Georgia Wing conducts a number of schools to support its three main missions (Emergency Services, Aerospace Education, and Cadet Programs). These schools provide instruction and hands on experience to members in a variety of areas, ranging from aviation to search and rescue.

Cadet Activities

See http://www.ncsas.com/ for more information on post-Encampment special activity events.

Encampment
This school is normally a week-long in-residence training program for cadets age 12-20, supervised by trained adult Cadet Programs Officers with USAF oversight. The encampment teaches basic cadets the fundamentals of followership and discipline in a fun environment that is both academic and applied, with hands on events. This course is typically held on a local military base (see CAPP 60-70 for more detail) and typical activities may include supervised rappelling, orientation flights in military aircraft, tours of base units and facilities, etc.  Encampment is NOT basic training; per CAPP 60-70, prospective encampment attendees must first complete promotion requirements for their first stripe (Curry Award) at their home unit, inclusive of passing physical fitness run/push-up/sit up/sit and reach standards, their first Leadership test, must have memorized the Cadet Oath, and must pass inspection for wear and grooming standards in both the USAF Blues and BDU uniform combinations.  Encampment IS intended to provide cadets with a taste of military life (typically with military style accommodations, food, and formations) intended to foster leadership growth and personal development in a positive, military style advanced training environment.  Encampment completion is required for promotion to Cadet Officer and is also the required gateway activity to qualify cadets to then attend National Special Activities (below). For more information, see National Cadet Programs - Encampments
Region Cadet Leadership School
RCLS is also a typically week-long course, offered for cadets in the grade of C/CMSGT and above per CAPR 52-16 (Section 8-7). RCLS is similar to Air Force ROTC's Field Training program, focusing on developing advanced cadets' leadership potential as indirect (officer role) leaders as opposed to direct (enlisted/NCO) leaders. This course involves both classroom instruction and applied leadership skills. and may be held within Georgia Wing or within a neighboring Wing of the Southeast Region.

Glider Flight Encampment
Glider Flight Encampments are held throughout the nation, and instruct cadets in the principles of flight, culminating in several rides with qualified instructors in an unpowered glider.

Powered Flight Encampment
Powered Flight Encampments instruct cadets in the basics of aviation. Cadets learn about ground and air procedures, as well as fly in CAP owned Cessna 172s and 182s. Cadets that do well during the program may earn their solo wings.

Adult Education opportunities
Volunteer University
In 2020, all of the CAP Adult education and Senior Program Levels courses were re-organized under the Volunteer University.  References to Squadron Leadership School (SLS),  Corporate Leadership Course (CLC), Region Staff College (RSC) or National Staff College (NSC) are obsolete and have been replaced.

See also
Georgia Air National Guard
Georgia State Defense Force

References

External links
Official Website
 Georgia Wing Civil Air Patrol

Wings of the Civil Air Patrol
Military units and formations in Georgia (U.S. state)